Jeff Snook (born 21 March 1960, in Ashland, Ohio) is an American sports writer and a 1982 graduate of The Ohio State University's School of Journalism.

Snook has written 14 non-fiction books, including his most recent—co-authoring Ken 
"Hawk" Harrelson's autobiography "Hawk: I Did It My Way," with the former Major-Leaguer and current Chicago White Sox play-by-play announcer. Snook also co-wrote longtime Virginia Tech Coach Frank Beamer's autobiography, "Let Me Be Frank." He also co-wrote "Busted: The Rise and Fall of Art Schlichter" with Art Schlichter, a former quarterback who was suspended by NFL Commissioner Pete Rozelle. He has written four books related to Ohio State football, including "What It Means To Be a Buckeye,", and others on the Oklahoma Sooners, Nebraska Cornhuskers and Florida Gators.

References

1960 births
Living people
American sportswriters
People from Ashland, Ohio
Journalists from Ohio
Ohio State University School of Communication alumni